Hannah Rothschild may refer to:

 Hannah Primrose, Countess of Rosebery (1851–1890), née Rothschild
 Hannah Mary Rothschild (born 1962), British writer, philanthropist, and documentary filmmaker